Pseudolampona is a genus of Australian white tailed spiders that was first described by Norman I. Platnick in 2000.

Species
 it contains twelve species:
Pseudolampona binnowee Platnick, 2000 – Australia (New South Wales)
Pseudolampona boree Platnick, 2000 – Southern Australia
Pseudolampona emmett Platnick, 2000 – Australia (Queensland)
Pseudolampona glenmore Platnick, 2000 – Australia (Queensland)
Pseudolampona jarrahdale Platnick, 2000 – Australia (Western Australia)
Pseudolampona kroombit Platnick, 2000 – Australia (Queensland)
Pseudolampona marun Platnick, 2000 – Australia (Western Australia)
Pseudolampona spurgeon Platnick, 2000 – Australia (Queensland)
Pseudolampona taroom Platnick, 2000 – Australia (Queensland, New South Wales)
Pseudolampona warrandyte Platnick, 2000 (type) – Southeastern Australia
Pseudolampona woodman Platnick, 2000 – Australia (Western Australia)
Pseudolampona wyandotte Platnick, 2000 – Australia (Queensland)

See also
 List of Lamponidae species

References

Araneomorphae genera
Lamponidae
Spiders of Australia